The Edward Bird House, at 290 E. Center St. in Beaver, Utah, was listed on the National Register of Historic Places in 1983.

Built of pink stone in 1893, it was deemed “an excellent example” of how Second Empire architecture was adapted in Beaver.

It is at the corner of Center St. and S. 300 East.

See also
Ellen Smith House, also Second Empire in Beaver

References

		
National Register of Historic Places in Beaver County, Utah
Houses completed in 1893